The Japanese numerals are the number names used in Japanese. In writing, they are the same as the Chinese numerals, and large numbers follow the Chinese style of grouping by 10,000. Two pronunciations are used: the Sino-Japanese (on'yomi) readings of the Chinese characters and the Japanese yamato kotoba (native words, kun'yomi readings).

Basic numbering in Japanese 
There are two ways of writing the numbers in Japanese: in Arabic numerals (1, 2, 3) or in Chinese numerals. The Arabic numerals are more often used in horizontal writing, and the Chinese numerals are more common in vertical writing.

Most numbers have two readings, one derived from Chinese used for cardinal numbers (On reading) and a native Japanese reading (Kun reading) used somewhat less formally for numbers up to 10. In some cases (listed below) the Japanese reading is generally preferred for all uses. Archaic readings are marked with †.

* The special reading 〇 maru (which means "round" or "circle") is also found. It may be optionally used when reading individual digits of a number one after another, instead of as a full number. A popular example is the famous 109 store in Shibuya, Tokyo which is read as ichi-maru-kyū (Kanji: 一〇九). (It can also be read as 'ten-nine'—pronounced tō-kyū—which is a pun on the name of the Tokyu department store which owns the building.) This usage of maru for numerical 0 is similar to reading numeral 0 in English as oh. Additionally, two and five are pronounced with a long vowel in phone numbers (i.e. にい nī and ごお gō).

As noted above, yon (4) and nana (7) are preferred to shi and shichi. It is purported that this is because shi is also the reading of the word , which makes it an unlucky reading (see tetraphobia); while shichi may sound too similar to ichi (1), shi or hachi (8). However, in quite a number of established words and phrases, shi and shichi are preferred; additionally, when counting (as in "ichi, ni, san, shi,..."), shi and shichi may be preferred.

The number 13 is sometimes considered unlucky, though this is a carryover from Western tradition. In contrast, 7 and sometimes 8 are considered lucky in Japanese.

In modern Japanese, cardinal numbers except 4 and 7 are generally given the on readings.  Alternate readings are used in month names, day-of-month names, and fixed phrases; for instance, April, July, and September are called shi-gatsu (4th month), shichi-gatsu (7th month), and ku-gatsu (9th month) respectively (for further detail see Japanese counter word#Exceptions). The on readings are also used when shouting out headcounts (e.g. ichi-ni-san-shi).

Larger numbers are made by combining these elements:

Tens from 20 to 90 are "(digit)-jū" as in 二十 (ni-jū) to 九十 (kyū-jū).
Hundreds from 200 to 900 are "(digit)-hyaku".
Thousands from 2000 to 9000 are "(digit)-sen".

Starting at 万 (10,000), numbers begin with 一 (ichi) if no digit would otherwise precede. That is, 100 is just 百 hyaku, and 1000 is just 千 sen, but 10,000 is 一万 ichiman, not just *man. (This differs from Chinese, where numbers begin with 一 if no digit would otherwise precede starting at 100.) And, if 千 sen directly precedes the name of powers of myriad, 一 ichi is normally attached before 千 sen, which yields 一千 issen. That is, 10,000,000 is normally read as 一千万 issenman. But if 千 sen does not directly precede the name of powers of myriad or if numbers are lower than 2,000, attaching 一 ichi is optional. That is, 15,000,000 is read as 千五百万 sengohyakuman or 一千五百万 issengohyakuman, and 1,500 as 千五百 sengohyaku or 一千五百 issengohyaku.

There are some phonetic modifications to larger numbers involving voicing or gemination of certain consonants, as typically occurs in Japanese (i.e. rendaku): e.g. roku "six" and hyaku "hundred" yield roppyaku "six hundred".

* This also applies to multiples of 10. Change ending -jū to -jutchō or -jukkei.
** This also applies to multiples of 100. Change ending -ku to -kkei.

In large numbers, elements are combined from largest to smallest, and zeros are implied.

Other types of numerals
For ordinal numbers, see Japanese counter word#Ordinal numbers.

Powers of 10

Large numbers 

Following Chinese tradition, large numbers are created by grouping digits into myriads (every 10,000) rather than the Western thousands (1,000):

Variation is due to the Jinkōki (塵劫記), Japan's oldest mathematics text. The initial edition was published in 1627. It had many errors. Most of these were fixed in the 1631 edition. In 1634, there was yet another edition which again changed a few values. The above variation is due to inconsistencies in the latter two editions. There are different characters for 10 (of which 秭 is in Chinese today), and after 10 they differ in whether they continue increasing by a factor of 10 or switch to 10. (If by a factor of 10, the intervening factors of 10 are produced with 万 man. The current edition of the Jinkōki, the 11th, follows a factor of 10 throughout, though some people still use the values from the 8th edition even today.)

The first three numbers with multisyllabic names and variation in assigned values ultimately derive from India, though they did not have defined values there. 恒河沙 gōgasha was originally used in Buddhist scripture for an indefinitely large quantity; it derives from गङ्गा gangā 'Ganges' (which conveniently includes the character 河 ka 'river') and 沙 sha 'sand', referring to the innumerable sands of the Ganges River. 阿僧祇 asōgi, from Sanskrit असंख्येय asaṃkhyeya 'uncountable/innumerable', with the negative prefix 阿 a, and 那由他 nayuta is from Sanskrit नयुत/नयुतः nayuta(h). After that, the numbers are Buddhist terms translated into or coined in Chinese and later assigned numerical values: 不可思議 fukashigi 'unimaginable' and 無量大数 muryōtaisū 'immeasurably large number'. 

Examples: (spacing by groups of four digits is given only for clarity of explanation)
1 0000 : 一万 (ichi-man)
983 6703 : 九百八十三万 六千七百三 (kyū-hyaku hachi-jū san man, roku-sen nana-hyaku san)
20 3652 1801 : 二十億 三千六百五十二万 千八百一 (ni-jū oku, san-zen rop-pyaku go-jū ni-man, sen hap-pyaku ichi)

However, numbers written in Arabic numerals are separated by commas every three digits following English-speaking convention. If Arabic numbers and kanji are used in combination, Western orders of magnitude may be used for numbers smaller than 10,000 (e.g. 2,500万 for 25,000,000).

In Japanese, when long numbers are written out in kanji, zeros are omitted for all powers of ten. Hence 4002 is 四千二 (in contrast, Chinese requires the use of 零 wherever a zero appears, e.g. 四千零二 for 4002).  However, when reading out a statement of accounts, for example, the skipped digit or digits are sometimes indicated by tobi (飛び) or tonde (飛んで): e.g. yon-sen tobi ni or yon-sen tonde ni instead of the normal yon-sen ni.

Decimal fractions 

Japanese has two systems of numerals for decimal fractions. They are no longer in general use, but are still used in some instances such as batting and fielding averages of baseball players, winning percentages for sports teams, and in some idiomatic phrases (such as 五分五分の勝負 "fifty-fifty chance"), and when representing a rate or discount. The bu fractions are also used when talking about fevers—for example 九度二分 (kudonibu) for 9 and two parts—the temperature 9.2°C.

One system is as follows:

This is the system used with the traditional Japanese units of measurement. Several of the names are used "as is" to represent a fraction of a sun.

The other system of representing these decimal fractions of rate or discount uses a system "shifted down" with a bu becoming a "one hundredth" and so on, and the unit for "tenth" becoming wari:

This is often used with prices. For example:
一割五分引き (ichi-wari go-bu biki): 15% discount
打率三割八分九厘 (daritsu san-wari hachi-bu kyū-rin): batting average .389

With the exception of wari, these are rarely seen in modern usage. Decimal fractions are typically written with either kanji numerals (vertically) or Arabic numerals (horizontally), preceded by a decimal point, and are read as successive digits, as in Western convention.  Note that, in written form, they can be combined with either the traditional system of expressing numerals (42.195 kilometers: 四十二・一九五 キロメートル), in which powers of ten are written, or with the place value system, which uses zero (50.04 percent: 五〇・〇四 パーセント.) In both cases, however, the reading follows the traditional system (yon-jū ni-ten ichi-kyū go kiromētoru for 42.195 kilometers; go ju-tten rei-yon pāsento for 50.04 percent.)

Formal numbers 

As with Chinese numerals, there exists in Japanese a separate set of kanji for numerals called daiji (大字) used in legal and financial documents to prevent unscrupulous individuals from adding a stroke or two, turning a one into a two or a three. The formal numbers are identical to the Chinese formal numbers except for minor stroke variations.  Today, the numbers for one, two, three, and ten are written only in their formal form in legal documents (the numbers 4 to 9 as well as 100, 1000 and 10000 are written identically to the common ones, cf. table below). These numbers' common forms can be changed to a higher value by adding strokes (1 and 2 were explained above, while 3 can be changed to 5, and 10 to 1000). In some cases, the digit 1 is explicitly written like 壱百壱拾 for 110, as opposed to 百十 in common writing.

Formal numbers:

The four current banknotes of the Japanese yen, 1000-yen, 2000-yen, 5000-yen, and 10000-yen, have formal numbers 千, 弐千, 五千, and 壱万, respectively.

Old Japanese

Old Japanese shares some vocabulary with later periods, but there are also unique number terms over 10 which are not used any more, aside from being parts of specific lexemes.

Notes:
 The transcription is based on the phoneme and is not phonetic. See Old Japanese for further information.
 See Jōdai Tokushu Kanazukai for information on subscript notation.

Hand counting

Japanese uses separate systems for counting for oneself and for displaying numbers to others, which both proceed up to ten. For counting, one begins with the palm open, then counts up to five by curling up (folding down) the fingers, starting from the thumb – thus one has just the thumb down (and others extended), while four has only the little finger extended, and five has a fist. One then counts up to ten by proceeding in the reverse order, extending the fingers, starting at the little finger – thus six is the same as four, seven the same as three, and so forth, with ten ending with the palm open. While this introduces ambiguity, it is not used to present to others, so this is generally not a problem. When displaying for others, one starts with the hand closed, and extends fingers, starting with the index, going to the little finger, then ending with the thumb, as in the United States. For numbers above five, one uses an open hand (indicating five) and places the appropriate number of fingers from the other hand against the palm (palms facing each other) – so six has the index finger against the palm, and so forth. To display ten, one presents both hands open and palm outwards.

Digits in written words 
Since the adoption of Arabic numerals, numbers have become written in Arabic numerals more and more often. Counters and ordinal numbers are typically written in Arabic numbers, such as 3人 (three people), 7月 (July, "seventh-month"), 20歳 (age 20), etc., although 三人、七月、and 二十歳 are also acceptable to write (albeit less common). However, numbers that are part of lexemes are typically written in kanji. For example, the term yaoya 八百屋 (tr.: vegetable stand / grocer) translates into "800 store", uses the Old Japanese pronunciation for 800, ya(h)o. The notorious Japanese organized crime syndicate, the yakuza, can be written 八九三 (or 893), a hand in oicho-kabu that is worth 0 points, indicating that yakuza are "worthless persons" or "gambling persons".

See also
Chinese numerals
Decimal mark
Japanese counter word
Japanese people
Japanese wordplay § Numeric substitution

References

External links
 大数の名前について 
 Ancient Japanese number system 
 English exercises for learning Japanese numerals
 Audio to learn the pronunciation for Japanese numbers
 Convert kanji numerals to arabic numerals (sci.lang.Japan FAQ page)
 Convert arabic numerals to kanji numerals (sci.lang.Japan FAQ page)

Japanese vocabulary
Numerals 
Science and technology in Japan